Richard Jacques LaFerrière (born January 3, 1961) is a Canadian former professional ice hockey goaltender. His only NHL appearance came on February 23, 1982 when he was called in to relieve Chico Resch of goaltending duties at start of the third period in a game against the Detroit Red Wings.

LaFerrière was member of the Tulsa Oilers (CHL) team that suspended operations on February 16, 1984, playing only road games for final six weeks of 1983-84 season. Despite this adversity, the team went on to win the league's championship.

After retiring from professional hockey, he went into the real estate business, and joined Chay Realty RE/MAX office in Barrie, Ontario.

Playing career
LaFerrière was born in Hawkesbury, Ontario. LaFerrière played four seasons (1978–1981) in the Ontario Hockey League with the Peterborough Petes and the Brantford Alexanders. LaFerrière was drafted in the fourth round, 64th overall, of the 1980 NHL Entry Draft by the Colorado Rockies.

LaFerrière began his professional career in the CHL  with the Fort Worth Texans, gaining 8 wins in 37 games played during the 1981-82 season. 
He played in one NHL game during the 1981–82 NHL season.
He played two seasons in the IHL with the Muskegon Mohawks, before concluding his playing career in the CHL with the Tulsa Oilers who he joined at the end of the 1983-84 season.

In the 1983-84 playoffs, LaFerrière played in one game, supporting his team's win of the CHL Championship and the Adams Cup.

Career statistics

Regular season and playoffs

International

Honours and awards
 1979 Memorial Cup (Peterborough)
 1979-80 OMJHL All-Star Second Team
 1979-80 OMJHL Goals-Against Average Leader (3.27 GAA)
 1979-80 OMJHL Dave Pinkney Trophy (Lowest Team GAA) (co-winner with Terry Wright)
 1980 World Junior Championships (fifth place)
 1980 Memorial Cup (Peterborough)
 1980 Memorial Cup Wins Leader (3 wins)
 1980 Hap Emms Memorial Trophy (Outstanding Goalie)
 1980 Memorial Cup All-Star First Team
1984 CHL Championship (Adams Cup) as a member of the Tulsa Oilers  team coached by Tom Webster.

See also
List of players who played only one game in the NHL

References

External links
 

1961 births
Living people
Brantford Alexanders players
Canadian expatriate ice hockey players in the United States
Canadian ice hockey goaltenders
Colorado Rockies (NHL) draft picks
Colorado Rockies (NHL) players
Fort Worth Texans players
Franco-Ontarian people
Ice hockey people from Ontario
Muskegon Mohawks players
People from Hawkesbury, Ontario
Peterborough Petes (ice hockey) players
Tulsa Oilers (1964–1984) players